Trypanites is  a narrow, cylindrical, unbranched boring which is one of the most common trace fossils in hard substrates such as rocks, carbonate hardgrounds and shells (Bromley, 1972).  It appears first in the Lower Cambrian (James et al., 1977), was very prominent in the Ordovician Bioerosion Revolution (Wilson and Palmer, 2006), and is still commonly formed today.  Trypanites is almost always found in calcareous substrates, most likely because the excavating organism used an acid or other chemical agent to dissolve the calcium carbonate (Taylor and Wilson, 2003). Trypanites is common in the Ordovician and Silurian hardgrounds of Baltica (Vinn et al. 2015).

References
 
 
 
 

 

Boring fossils
Paleozoic life of Ontario
Paleozoic life of Manitoba
Paleozoic life of Newfoundland and Labrador
Paleozoic life of Quebec